Tribl Nights Anthologies is a collaborative live album by American contemporary worship groups Tribl and Maverick City Music. The album was released on April 29, 2022, via Tribl Records. The album features appearances by Lizzie Morgan, Cecily, Melvin Crispell III, Ryan Ofei, Joe L Barnes, Dante Bowe, Jonathan Traylor, Doe, Jekalyn Carr, JJ Hairston, Amanda Cook, Brandon Lake, Mariah Adigun, Nate Diaz, Katie Torwalt, and Sam Collier. The album was produced by Tony Brown and Jonathan Jay.

Tribl Nights Anthologies debuted at number 41 on Billboard's Top Christian Albums chart and at number six Top Gospel Albums chart in the United States.

Background
Tribl and Maverick City Music announced that they will release a new album titled Tribl Nights Anthologies on April 29, 2022. Tribl Nights Anthologies is a collection of songs and sermons by traditional gospel and CCM artists who would not usually gather together in a room, which was recorded during a live worship series in the summer of 2021. The album features Lizzie Morgan, Cecily, Melvin Crispell III, Ryan Ofei, Joe L Barnes, Dante Bowe, Jonathan Traylor, Doe, Jekalyn Carr, JJ Hairston, Amanda Cook, Brandon Lake, Mariah Adigun, Nate Diaz, Katie Torwalt, and Sam Collier.

Release and promotion
On March 25, 2022, Tribl and Maverick City Music released their first promotional single from the album, "Too Good to Not Believe" featuring Lizzie Morgan, Cecily and Melvin Crispell III, availing the album for digital pre-order.

On March 25, 2022, Tribl and Maverick City Music released their second promotional single from the album, "King of Heaven (Reign Jesus Reign)" featuring Ryan Ofei, Nate Diaz and Lizzie Morgan.

Commercial performance
In the United States, Tribl Nights Anthologies debuted at number 41 on the Top Christian Albums chart, and at number six on the Top Gospel Albums chart, dated May 14, 2022.

Track listing

Charts

Weekly charts

Year-end charts

Release history

References

External links
 

2022 live albums
Tribl albums
Maverick City Music albums